The helicis major (or large muscle of helix) is an intrinsic muscle of the outer ear.

In human anatomy, it is the form of a narrow vertical band situated upon the anterior margin of the helix, at the point where the helix becomes transverse.

It arises below, from the spina helicis, and is inserted into the anterior border of the helix, just where it is about to curve backward.

The function of the muscle is to adjust the shape of the ear by depressing the anterior margin of the ear cartilage. While the muscle modifies the auricular shape only minimally in the majority of individuals, this action could increase the opening into the external acoustic meatus in some.

The helicis major is developmentally derived from the second pharyngeal arch. It seem that only in primates is the helicis minor and major two distinctive muscles.

Additional images

See also
 Intrinsic muscles of external ear
 Helicis minor

References

External links
 AnatomyExpert.com

Ear
Muscles of the head and neck